Christoffel Joseph Mooy (February 10, 1921 – August 12, 1971) is a member of the People's Representative Council of Indonesia. He was chosen as the 6th general secretary of the Indonesian Christian Party at its 8th congress.

Early life 
Christoffel Joseph Mooy was born in Kupang, Timor, Dutch East Indies, on February 10, 1921. He went to the People's School for his elementary school, and later he went to the Technical School and High School to finish his higher studies.

Military career 
He was a first lieutenant infantry personnel from the 28th Brigade of the 3rd Military Regional Command.

Political career

In the Indonesian Christian Party 
In the 1955 Indonesian legislative election, Mooy was elected as the member of the People's Representative Council from the East Nusa Tenggara electoral district. He ended his membership on 26 June 1960, after the formation of the People's Representative Council of Mutual Assistance, in which he wasn't chosen by the president to seat the legislative.

Mooy was chosen as the general secretary of the Indonesian Christian Party at its 8th congress from 8–11 February 1962 in Yogyakarta.

Family 
Mooy was married to Paulina Susana Mboeik. He married her on 25 April 1951.

Death 
Christoffel Joseph Mooy died in Jakarta on August 12, 1971 at the Cikini Hospital.

References

Bibliography 

1921 births
1971 deaths
Indonesian Christians
People from Kupang